The PowerShot Pro1 is a digital camera made by Canon, announced in February 2004 and was discontinued first quarter of 2006.  It uses a Sony-built 2/3 in (17 mm) 8.3 megapixel CCD image sensor, which gives a usable image size of approximately 8.0 megapixels.  It was the most expensive fixed-lens camera sold by Canon at the time, and thus the top of the PowerShot range. It was the first fixed lens designated a Canon L series lens, a designation normally reserved for expensive EF-series SLR lenses.

It has a variable-angle two-inch, polycrystalline silicon, thin-film transistor, color liquid crystal display with approximately 235,000 pixels and a colour electronic viewfinder (EVF) with the same resolution. The lens has a zoom range of 7.2 to 50.8 mm, equivalent to 28 to 200 mm in 35 mm terms. The shutter has a maximum speed of 1/4,000 second. The camera's dimensions are 117.5 mm in width, 72 mm in height, and 90.3 mm in depth. Its mass is 545 g.

References 
 Canon's PowerShot Pro1 Information Page
 Canon Inc. Powershot Pro1.  Retrieved on October 26, 2005.
 DPReview.com. Canon PowerShot Pro1 Review.  Retrieved on October 26, 2005.
 Shuttertalk.com. Canon PowerShot Pro1 Review.  Retrieved on December 5, 2005.

External links 

P